Paroo is a locality in the Mid West region of Western Australia.  It once was a stop on the now closed Wiluna Branch Railway.

According to Western Australian Government Railways, the former railway station altitude was the highest in the Western Australia railway system in the 1940s.

References 

Towns in Western Australia
Mid West (Western Australia)